The 2016 City of Wolverhampton Council election took place on 5 May 2016 to elect members of City of Wolverhampton Council in England. 20 seats are being contested in total (one third of the Council). This was on the same day as other local elections.

The ward of Tettenhall Regis is notable for having two Conservative Party candidates nominated for a single seat. The Conservative Party confirmed that Udey Singh was the official candidate, and the additional nomination for Mark Evans, the incumbent retiring Councillor, was an 'administrative error'.

Ward results

Bilston East

Bilston North

Blakenhall

Bushbury North

Bushbury South and Low Hill

East Park

Ettingshall

Fallings Park

Graiseley

Heath Town

Merry Hill

Oxley

Park

Penn

Spring Vale

St Peter’s

Tettenhall Regis

Tettenhall Wightwick

Wednesfield North

Wednesfield South

References

2016 English local elections
2016
2010s in the West Midlands (county)